Mararikkulam North is a village in Alappuzha district in the Indian state of Kerala.

Demographics
 India census, Mararikkulam North had a population of 29101 with 14231 males and 14870 females.

References

Villages in Alappuzha district